The Port of London Authority (PLA) is a self-funding public trust established on 31 March 1909 in accordance with the Port of London Act 1908 to govern the Port of London. Its responsibility extends over the Tideway of the River Thames and its continuation (the Kent/Essex strait). It maintains and supervises navigation, and protects the river's environment.

The PLA originally operated all enclosed dock systems on the river (except the Regent's Canal Dock), but these have long been closed to commercial traffic, with the exception of Port of Tilbury, which was privatised in 1992. It inherited the private police forces of the companies which had previously run the docks, reorganising them into a single Port of London Authority Police.

Finance 
The PLA receives no funding from the government and is entirely self-financing. Revenues are raised from conservancy charges on vessels and cargo, pilotage charges, annual port dues, hydrographic services, river works licence fees and charges for other services.

Limits

The PLA's responsibility extends from a point marked by an obelisk just downstream of Teddington Lock (the upstream limit of the tidal river) to the end of the Kent/Essex strait of the North Sea (between Margate to the south and Gunfleet Lighthouse, near Frinton-on-Sea, to the north,) a total of about 95 miles (150 km). The PLA does not cover the Medway or the Swale.

From the City of London, via the Thames Conservancy, the PLA inherited the conservancy, management and control of the river instead of ownership of the bed of the river and foreshore (the Crown was prohibited from alienating any of its lands by section 5 of the Crown Lands Act 1702, the Crown was presumed to own the bed of Thames and 'as conservators' the City of London were prohibited from owning any part of that same river bed) from Teddington to the Yantlet Line (between Southend and Grain).

During much of the 20th century the PLA owned and operated many of the docks and wharfs in the port, but they have all now been either closed or privatised. Today the PLA acts mainly as a managing authority for the tidal stretch of the River Thames, ensuring safe navigation, and the well-being of the port and its activities. Comparable responsibilities for the river including, and upstream of, Teddington Lock fall to the Environment Agency.

The PLA today has a number of statutory duties, including river traffic control, security, navigational safety (including pilotage, buoys, beacons, bridge lights and channel surveys), conservation (including dredging and maintaining certain river banks), encouraging both commercial and leisure uses of the river, and protecting its environment. The PLA is responsible for the operation of Richmond Lock, but not for the Thames Barrier which is managed by the Environment Agency in its flood management role.

Harbour masters 
The PLA's navigational safety team is headed by a Chief Harbour Master who has overall responsibility for defining and enforcing the regulations needed to support and manage the safety of navigation within the PLA's limits. Given the extensive length of river covered by the PLA, day-to-day management of the river is overseen by a team of harbour masters who cover the entirety of the river between Teddington Lock and the outer estuary.

Centres

The PLA originally had its headquarters on Tower Hill in the City of London, but today it is based at London River House and Royal Terrace Pier in Gravesend. The PLA retains a presence in the City in offices at Pinnacle House on St. Dunstan's Hill, where the Chair and Chief Executive are based.

Control of ship traffic on the Thames within the Port is orchestrated from two Port Control centres:
The Thames Barrier Navigation Centre in Woolwich, for reaches upstream of Erith, London, and
Port Control Gravesend (the main facility) for reaches downstream of Erith.

Both Port Control centres operate the same system for coordinating traffic within the PLA's area, Vessel Traffic Services (VTS). The system involves 16 radar stations along the river and out in the estuary.

The PLA owns Denton Wharf and Jetty in Gravesend, which is the main base for its fleet of more than 40 vessels. It also provides lift-out and maintenance services for other users of the Thames. The PLA owns Barrier Gardens Pier and Unity House, near the Thames Barrier, providing a convenient base for its Driftwood vessels. There are also two pilot stations at Harwich and Ramsgate, beyond the estuary and the Port of London. From these stations pilots are sent out and return from large vessels entering and leaving the Port.

The PLA employs about 360 people.

Pier and jetty ownership 

The PLA owns six piers and jetties on the River Thames. These are available for other river users as well as the PLA's own vessels.

 Barrier Gardens Pier and Unity House, Woolwich
 Royal Terrace Pier and landing stage, Gravesend
 Denton Wharf and Jetty, Gravesend
 Masthouse Terrace Pier, Isle of Dogs
 Peruvian Wharf, Newham
 Royal Primrose Wharf, Newham

Vessels

The PLA has four channel surveying vessels, eight launches for harbour and river patrols, and twenty other craft. Five new patrol vessels were built by Alnmaritec in Northumberland and delivered in 2009.

Harbour Service vessels
Chelsea and Richmond. Catamarans designed for shallow water working in the upper reaches of the port area.
Lambeth, Kew, Southwark and Barnes. Catamarans designed for the lower tidal waters and for use as Pilot cutters.
Easthaven and Crane two shallow draught RIBs, the former based at Holehaven and the latter at Richmond.

Marine Service vessels

London Titan. Mooring maintenance vessel
Driftwood II and Driftwood III. Primarily designed for the clearance of driftwood and other debris from the river. Also equipped for salvage operations. Normally accompanied by a fast tender.
PLA Diver. Diving support vessel.
Impulse. Pusher tug for handling barges. Also equipped for salvage and clearance work.
Recover and Respond. Oil clearance vessels.
Gunfleet. Open deck RIB.
Benfleet Wheelhouse fitted RIB used for crew transfer purposes.

Hydrographic Surveying vessels
Maplin, Thame, Yantlet and Galloper. Various catamarans equipped with advanced hydrographic survey equipment. There is also a RIB for use in very shallow waters.

Pilot cutters
Patrol. Ex. Estuary Services vessel built by Halmatic, based on the Arun class lifeboat design. Based at Gravesend.
Guide. Ex. Estuary Services vessel, 48/50', built by Halmatic. Based at Gravesend.
Leader. A hybrid diesel and battery electric boat by Goodchild Marine, delivered in 2019. Based at Gravesend.
There are six cutters based at Ramsgate and Sheerness operated by Estuary Services Ltd, a company owned by the PLA.

Railways

The PLA inherited an extensive railway system from the previous dock companies. This included engine sheds, located at Millwall, Tilbury and Custom House, its own signal boxes and level crossings. The main duties undertaken by the authority's locomotives were shunting the various sidings, wharves and factories around the PLA estate.

The PLA operated a fleet of 0-6-0T and 0-6-0ST steam locomotives made by various manufacturers including Hudswell Clark, Robert Stephenson, Andrew Barclay, Hunslet and Manning Wardle. The steam locomotives were largely withdrawn in 1959 although a few lingered on until 1963. The diesels that replaced them were built by the Yorkshire Engine Company but, with declining traffic, the railway system closed on 1 May 1970.

Traditions
The Lord Mayor of London, the chief dignitary of the City of London, is ex officio the Admiral of the Port of London.

The PLA uses a blue ensign with a gold heraldic sealion on all its vessels. It also has a house flag and pennants for the use of the chairman and the vice chairman of its board.

The coat of arms of the PLA was granted in August 1909. The blazon or heraldic description is as follows:
Azure, issuing from a castle argent, a demi-man vested, holding in the dexter hand a drawn sword, and in the sinister a scroll Or, the one representing the Tower of London, the other the figure of St Paul, the patron saint of London.Crest: On a wreath of the colours, an ancient ship Or, the main sail charged with the arms of the City of London. Supporters: On either side a sea-lion argent, crined, finned and tufted or, issuing from waves of the sea proper, that to the sinister grasping the banner of King Edward II; that to the dexter the banner of King Edward VII

The Latin motto is "Floreat Imperii Portvs", meaning "May the Port of the Empire Flourish".

See also

 London River Services
 List of locations in the Port of London
 List of navigation authorities in the United Kingdom
 Brackish water detailing the type of water of the Thames Estuary as opposed to the North Sea's Kent/Essex Strait which in terms of sea water salinity stops at Gravesend

References

External links
 Port of London - the website of the Port of London Authority
 Boating on the Thames
 OPLAC - the website of the Organisation of Port of London Authority Customers

Competent harbour authorities
Organizations established in 1909
Organisations based in the City of London
Port authorities in the United Kingdom
Port of London
Economic history of London
1908 establishments in England